Kang Hoon (Korean: 강훈, born May 23, 1991) is a South Korean actor. He is best known for his role in the historical drama The Red Sleeve (2021).

Filmography

Film

Television series

Web series

Web shows

Ambassadorship 
 Public relations ambassador for the National Museum of Korea (2023)

Awards and nominations

References

External links 
 
 
 

1991 births
Living people
South Korean male television actors
University of Suwon alumni
21st-century South Korean male actors